Bradford Township is one of twelve townships in Chickasaw County, Iowa, USA.  As of the 2000 census, its population was 2,140.

History
Bradford Township is named for Chief Bradford of the Chickasaw Indians.

Geography
According to the USGS, it contains five cemeteries: Cagley, Greenwood, Oak Hill, Pearl Rock Catholic and Saint Michaels.

The streams of Little Cedar River and Twomile Creek run through this township.

Transportation
Bradford Township contains two airports or landing strips: Clevelands Landing Strip and Harrison Landing Strip.

Notes

References
 USGS Geographic Names Information System (GNIS)

External links
 US-Counties.com
 City-Data.com

Townships in Chickasaw County, Iowa
Townships in Iowa